Vestris may refer to:

Performers 
 Angiolo Vestris (1730–1809), French-Italian ballet dancer and actor
 Auguste Vestris (1760–1842), French dancer, illegitimate son of Gaétan Vestris
 Auguste Armand Vestris (1788–1825), French dancer, son of Auguste Vestris
 Gaétan Vestris (1729–1808), French-Italian ballet dancer
 Lucia Elizabeth Vestris (Elizabetta Lucia Bartolozzi, 1797–1856), English singer and actress-manager, wife of Auguste Armand Vestris, called on stage Madame Vestris as well as her great-aunt-in law.
 Rose Vestris (Françoise-Rose Gourgaud, 1743–1804) French actress, wife of Angiolo Vestris, called on stage Madame Vestris

Ships  
 , a British passenger liner that sank on 12 November 1928; 112 of 325 passengers and crew were lost.